Generation Wild is the third studio album by Swedish glam metal band Crashdïet. The album was released on April 14, 2010. It is the first album to feature the band's new vocalist Simon Cruz since the departure of their previous singer H. Olliver Twisted. The album debuted at #3 on the Swedish Album Chart. The title track, Generation Wild, was released as the first single on February 28, 2010. The video was banned from MTV due to obscene images. The original record features 11 songs but five bonus track were also recorded and released on different editions of the album.

On June 7, 2011, Generation Wild was released in the United States through Frontiers Records.

Track listing

Bonus 
"Sick Mind" [Japan edition]
"One of a Kind" [Generation Wild Single] (Sweet, London, Gunn)
"Fear Control" [Generation Wild Single] (Young, Sweet, Gunn)
"Caught In Despair" [Free download before release of album]
"Hollywood Teaze" [Vinyl Edition] (Sweet)

Singles 
"Generation Wild"
"Chemical"

Personnel
 Simon Cruz – vocals
 Martin Sweet – guitar
 Peter London – bass
 Eric Young – drums

References

2010 albums
Crashdïet albums